Dwan Hurt (March 29, 1963 – November 25, 2016) was an American basketball coach and player. He played college basketball for the Gonzaga Bulldogs as a point guard and later coached at Junipero Serra High School for 27 years.

College career
After graduating from high school in 1981, Hurt attended El Camino College for two years. In 1984 he joined Gonzaga. He earned a starting role midway through his first season, scoring 10 points in that first start against Montana State. In February 1985, he scored a buzzer beater to beat Loyola Marymount 51–49. In 25 games, including 15 starts, he averaged 4.8 points and 3.3 assists. As a senior, Hurt started in 25 of the team's 28 games, averaging 4.7 points and 2.1 assists per game.

Coaching career
Hurt was named 2010 State Coach of the Year by Cal-Hi Sports; Daily Breeze Coach of the Year 2010; and coached his high school alma mater, the Serra Cavaliers, to the 2010 California Interscholastic Federation Division III Boys Basketball State Championship. He also led Serra to State Division IV title in 1993. Hurt coached Serra for 28 seasons and led the Cavaliers to eight CIF Southern Section titles and two CIF State titles. He won his 500th game in late 2013 and was among the winningest active coaches in the state.

Personal life
Hurt's brother, Cedric Hurt, was a basketball coach.

Hurt died in his sleep on November 25, 2016.

References

External links
College statistics at Sports Reference

1963 births
2016 deaths
African-American basketball players
American men's basketball players
Gonzaga Bulldogs men's basketball players
High school basketball coaches in the United States
20th-century African-American sportspeople
21st-century African-American people